Elworthy is a small village and civil parish in the Brendon Hills  south-east of Watchet, and  west of Taunton, in the Somerset West and Taunton district of Somerset, England. The parish includes the hamlet of Willett.

History

The parish of Elworthy was part of the Williton and Freemanners Hundred.

Willett House was built around 1816 as a country house by Richard Carver (Architect) for Daniel Blommert. Its date of construction is uncertain but it was recorded in 1791 and is believed to have been built in 1774 with funds raised of £130 by public subscription.

Governance

The parish council has responsibility for local issues, including setting an annual precept (local rate) to cover the council's operating costs and producing annual accounts for public scrutiny. The parish council evaluates local planning applications and works with the local police, district council officers, and neighbourhood watch groups on matters of crime, security, and traffic. The parish council's role also includes initiating projects for the maintenance and repair of parish facilities, as well as consulting with the district council on the maintenance, repair, and improvement of highways, drainage, footpaths, public transport, and street cleaning. Conservation matters (including trees and listed buildings) and environmental issues are also the responsibility of the council.

The village falls within the non-metropolitan district of Somerset West and Taunton, which was established on 1 April 2019. It was previously in the district of West Somerset, which was formed on 1 April 1974 under the Local Government Act 1972, and part of Williton Rural District before that. The district council is responsible for local planning and building control, local roads, council housing, environmental health, markets and fairs, refuse collection and recycling, cemeteries and crematoria, leisure services, parks, and tourism.

Somerset County Council is responsible for running the largest and most expensive local services such as education, social services, libraries, main roads, public transport, policing and  fire services, trading standards, waste disposal and strategic planning.

It is also part of the Bridgwater and West Somerset county constituency represented in the House of Commons of the Parliament of the United Kingdom. It elects one Member of Parliament (MP) by the first past the post system of election.

Religious sites

The Church of St Martin, dedicated to St Martin of Tours, dates from the 13th century and has been designated by English Heritage as a Grade II* listed building. The church is in the care of the Churches Conservation Trust.

Notable residents

Marshal of the Royal Air Force Samuel Charles Elworthy, Baron Elworthy  KG GCB CBE DSO LVO DFC AFC (23 March 1911 – 4 April 1993) was a senior officer in the Royal Air Force and was made a life peer as Baron Elworthy, of Timaru in New Zealand and of Elworthy.

References

External links

Villages in West Somerset
Civil parishes in Somerset